Beaulieu station may refer to:

Beaulieu Park rail station, a proposed railway station in Chelmsford, Essex
Beaulieu Road railway station, a railway station in the New Forest, Hampshire
Beauly railway station, a railway station in the Highland council area of Scotland